The West Virginia Wildfire is a women's American football team in the Women's Spring Football League since 2011.  The first women's football team in West Virginia, the Wildfire is based in the city of Belle.

In their inaugural season, the WildKats were known as the West Virginia Wonders and played in the National Women's Football Association.  After that inaugural season, the team was originally set to play in the Women's Football Alliance for 2009 as the West Virginia WildKats, but then they decided to take the next two seasons off to reorganize further.

In 2012, the Wildfire won their first ever championship, winning the WSFL's 8-man division title.
In 2013, the Wildfire beat the Binghamton Tigercats 44–8 to win their second consecutive WSFL 8-man title.

Season-by-season 

|-
| colspan="6" align="center" | West Virginia Wonders (NWFA)
|-
|2008 || 0 || 8 || 0 || 4th North Central || --
|-
|2009 || colspan="6" rowspan="2" align="center" | Did Not Play
|-
|2010
|-
| colspan="6" align="center" | West Virginia Wildfire (WSFL)
|-
|2011 || 0 || 3 || 1 || -- || --
|-
|2012 || 5 || 2 || 0 || 1st 8-man division || Champions
|-
|2013 || 6 || 0 || 0 || 1st 8-man division || Champions
|-
!Totals || 11 || 13 || 1
|colspan="2"| (including playoffs)

External links
West Virginia Wildfire website

National Women's Football Association teams
Women's Spring Football League teams
Sports in Charleston, West Virginia
American football teams in West Virginia
American football teams established in 2008
2008 establishments in West Virginia
Women's sports in West Virginia